The 1918–19 season was Manchester United's fourth and final season in the non-competitive War League during the First World War.

With the ongoing First World War, once again Manchester United played non-competitive war league football. In the principal tournament they contested the Lancashire Section, in a 30-game season. In the subsidiary tournament they contested Group C of the Lancashire Section, in a group of four teams. However, none of these were considered to be competitive football, and thus their records are not recognised by the Football League.

Lancashire Section Principal Tournament

Lancashire Section Subsidiary Tournament Group C

References

Manchester United F.C. seasons
Manchester United